Baltimore's Marching Ravens are the official marching band of the Baltimore Ravens American football team.  They were founded as the Baltimore Colts' Marching Band on September 7, 1947, and have continuously operated ever since, supporting four separate football franchises. The band first supported the original Baltimore Colts from 1947 to 1950, but continued to operate even after the franchise disbanded in 1950. After a new Baltimore Colts franchise was installed in 1953, the band became associated with the newly founded team. The band endured a second relocation when the Colts moved to Indianapolis in the middle of the night in 1984, leaving Baltimore without a team for eleven years. The band became attached to the Canadian Football League Baltimore CFL Colts/Baltimore Stallions during the league's United States Expansion Team Experiment years between 1994 and 1995. Then in 1996, the band became attached to a 4th franchise when the Cleveland Browns relocated to Baltimore in 1996 and became the Ravens. They are one of two official marching bands in the NFL, the other being the Washington Commanders Marching Band.

Background
According to an ESPN documentary directed by Baltimore native Barry Levinson called The Band That Wouldn't Die, band leaders got advance warning that the team was being moved from Baltimore to Indianapolis overnight and were able to remove their equipment from team headquarters before the moving vans arrived. At the time of the move, the band's uniforms were being dry-cleaned. Band President John Ziemann contacted the owner of the dry cleaners, who told Ziemann that legally they could not release the uniforms to Ziemann, but told him that that evening, he should take the company van "for a walk", where Ziemann found the uniforms in the back. Ziemann and some associates then hid the uniforms in a nearby cemetery, in a mausoleum belonging to the family of one of the band members, until the wife of then-Colts owner, Robert Irsay, said they could keep them.

From 1984 until the Cleveland Browns relocated to Baltimore in 1996, the band stayed together, playing at football halftime shows and marching in parades, eventually becoming well known as "Baltimore's Pro-Football Musical Ambassadors". The band supported itself and remained an all-volunteer organization until the 2013 season when the Ravens organization was required to pay them. At one point, John Ziemann pawned his wife's wedding ring for the money to buy new equipment. After the 2012 season, the Flagline and Honor guard sections were dropped from the band.

One of the band's first gigs after the Colts left was an invitation from then-Cleveland Browns owner Art Modell to play during the halftime show of a Browns game. "They were cheap," Modell said, somewhat jokingly.

When Baltimore was in the running for a National Football League franchise in the 1990s, Ziemann enlisted the band's help in convincing the Maryland General Assembly, the state legislature, to approve funding for a new football stadium. The band played on the steps of the Maryland State House while the legislature was in session one evening, causing a crowd to gather, including then-Governor William Donald Schaefer, who had been pushing hard for a team and a football stadium. Eventually, the legislature approved the funding.

When the Cleveland Browns announced their planned move to Baltimore, the band wondered if the team had any plans for them. On an episode of a local talk show hosted by Kwesi Mfume that featured David Modell and Johnny Unitas, the host introduced Ziemann to a huge round of applause. Ziemann then asked Modell if the band could become the Ravens' official band, to which Modell smiled and said, "I thought you already were," as the crowd roared its approval again. (In The Band That Wouldn't Die, Modell said that there was "no question" about the band affiliating with the Ravens. Modell had always wanted a team band, and he believed that that such a well-regarded band had stood ready to fill that role for over a decade was a "dream come true".)

For the Ravens' first two seasons, the band retained its name as The Baltimore Colts Marching Band, allowing the band to give what David Modell called a "2-year bow". At the start of the 1998 season, it assumed its current name, The Marching Ravens, coinciding with the opening of what is now M&T Bank Stadium in 1998, as well as the Indianapolis Colts making their first visit to Baltimore since their relocation.

For Ravens' home games the band performs a short concert on Eutaw Street and then marches from Oriole Park at Camden Yards down Ravens Walk into M&T Bank Stadium playing the Baltimore Ravens' fight song and other tunes. Before the game the band performs a pre-game field show and stays on the field for the playing of the national anthem. The band also marches a halftime show during most home games.

The band also had a new fight song for the Ravens, which was drastically different from the old Colts fight song. In 2010, Ziemann announced that the band was considering using the Colts fight song with new lyrics for the Ravens. Fans were allowed to vote online whether they wanted the old Colts fight song returned, or to resume the newer Ravens fight song. Over 10,000 votes were cast, with an overwhelming 79% in favor of using the Colts fight song with new lyrics.

"The Baltimore Fight Song" lyrics
Baltimore Ravens, lets go/And put that ball across the line
So fly on with talons spread wide/Go in and strike with Ravens pride.(Fight! Fight! Fight!)
Ravens dark wings, take to flight/Dive in and show them your might
For Baltimore and Maryland, you will fly on to victory!

References

External links
 Baltimore's Marching Ravens website
 ESPN 30 for 30 Series

Baltimore Ravens
NFL marching bands